Shilongba is a town in Huaping County, Yunnan, China.

Etymology 
Legend said that there is a Chinese dragon here, which often drowned farmland and endangered the people. The Jade Emperor sent Leigong to kill the dragon, as time goes by, its bones became the river bottom and dam, hence the name of "Shilongba".

Administrative division 
As of 2016, the town is divided into six villages: 
 Minzhu
 Jizuo
 Demao
 Longquan
 Longjing
 Linjiang

History 
In 1931, the Huaping government set up the Tianma Township in this area.

After establishment of the Communist State, in 1950, it belonged to the 3rd District. In 1958, it was renamed "Minzhu People's Commune". In 1988, Shilongba Yi and Dai Ethnic Township separated from the area. On 14 August 2012, Shilongba Yi and Dai Ethnic Township was revoked and reformed as "Shilongba".

Geography 
The town is situated at southeastern Huaping County.

There are two reservoirs in the town.

There are a number of popular mountains located immediately adjacent to the townsite which include Xianling Mountain (Maoshuikong (and Xicaodi Mountain (.

The Xinzhuang River, Longquan River, Longtang River and Longjing River flow through the town.

Economy 
The town's economy is based on nearby mineral resources and agricultural resources. The main crops are rice, wheat, corn, and sweet potato. Economic crops are mainly mango, pomegranate, citrus, pepper, bamboo, peach, and pear. The region abounds with coal, iron, gold, limestone, and quartz.

Demographics 

As of 2017, the National Bureau of Statistics of China estimates the town's population now to be 18,000. There are 12 ethnic groups in the town, such as Yi, Dai, and Lisu.

Transportation 
The China National Highway 353 passes across the town north to south.

The G4216 Expressway is a west–east expressway in the town.

References

Bibliography 

Divisions of Huaping County